Senator Mount may refer to:

James A. Mount (1843–1901), Indiana State Senate
Willie Mount (born 1949), Louisiana State Senate

See also
William L. Mounts (1862–1929), Illinois State Senate